Henricus Canisius (1562, Nijmegen - 2 September 1610, Ingolstadt) was a Dutch canonist and historian.

Biography 
Canisius was born Hendrik de Hondt ("The Dog", Latinized to Canisius) and belonged to the same distinguished family as Saint Peter Canisius, who was his uncle. He studied at the University of Leuven, and in 1590 was appointed professor of canon law at Ingolstadt.

Works 
He was the author of "Summa Juris Canonici" (Ingolstadt, 1594); "Praelectiones Academicae" (ib., 1609); "Comment. in lib. III decretalium" (ib., 1629); "De Sponsalibus et Matrimonio" (ib., 1613). A complete edition of his canonical writings appeared in Leuven in 1649 and in Cologne in 1662.
 
The fruits of his labours in the historical field appeared in a work entitled, "Antiquae Lectiones, seu antiqua monumenta ad historiam mediae aetatis illustrandam" (6 volumes, Ingolstadt, 1601–1604). In 1608 a seventh volume, a "Promptuarium Ecclesiasticum" was added by way of supplement. The work lacked systematic arrangement, and included much matter of minor value. It was afterwards entirely recast and critically sifted by Basnage, under the title "Thesaurus Monumentorum ecclesiasticorum et historicorum" (7 vols., Antwerp, 1725). Canisius edited for the first time the "Chronica Victoris Episcop. Tunnunensis et Joannis Episcop. Biclariensis", and the "Legatio Luitprandi" (Ingolstadt, 1600). We are likewise indebted to him for an edition of the "Historiae miscellae Pauli Diaconi" (ib., 1603).

References

Attribution

1562 births
1610 deaths
Canon law jurists
People from Nijmegen
Old University of Leuven alumni
Academic staff of the University of Ingolstadt
16th-century Dutch jurists
17th-century Dutch jurists